Government Arts and Science College, Meenchantha, Kozhikode is one of the oldest government college in Kozhikode, Kerala.  The college has grows considerably over the years and has started accommodating science courses also and underwent a name-change from Arts College to Arts and Science College because of the changes in the course structure.

Government Arts & Science College, Calicut 
Government Arts & Science College, Calicut, Meenchanda, is one of the well-known colleges in Kerala established in 1964. The College is affiliated to the University of Calicut and is maintained according to the strict Government policy of admission based on merit and reservation for backward classes. Reservation for SC/ ST/OEC/SEBC are strictly followed. the College has a quota for Lakshadweep students and from its inception many students have graduated from this institution. One point of significance of the Govt. College is that the Teachers and Non-teaching staff are recruited through Kerala Public Service commission based on written test and interview, adhering to reservation policy. 

The College maintains an atmosphere conducive to the development of curricular as well as co-curricular activities. The Teachers and students have a healthy interaction in academic pursuit as well as co-curricular activities. One wings of combined (boys and girl) NCC is active in training and extension programmes. Two NSS Unitsm Nature Club, Career Guidance Cell, Grievance Redressal Forum, Parent-Teacher Association, Alumni Association, Co-operative store, Compulsory Social Service Schme, Cricket Club etc, are lively agencies of this institution. The College has related itself with the needs of the neighboring people. A post Office functions in the campus with this motive. The Co-operative store provides Telephone facility for students and staff members. Every year, students form a College Union through an election. The College Union takes up the responsibility of representing their ideas, programmes and problems.

The Staff Council, with the Principal as its Chairman, the heads of Departments and elected staff as its members, meet regularly to evaluate the needs and development of the College. Though the permission of the Government is required in all policy matters, the Principals, Teachers and students strive for the smooth functioning of the College with ambitions and dreams for a steady growth of the institution.

BA/BSc./B.com Degree courses
Part I English

Part II Malayalam, HIndi, Arabic, Sanskrit

Part III any subject in part III

B.A Programmes
Pattern I

BA Economics - Core ,Indian History, Politics - Complimentary

BA English Language and Literature - Core British History, Journalism and Political Science - Complimentary

BA History - Core Politics, Economics - Complimentary

BA Malayalam Core, Sanskrit and Journalism - complimentary

BA Hindi Core ,Cultural History in Hindi, Correspondence Secretarial drafting in Hindi

Pattern II

BA History- Arabic Main (Double main)

B.Sc. Programmes
BSc Physics - Core, Mathematics and Chemistry - Complimentary

BSc Zoology - Core ,Chemistry and Botany - Complimentary

BSc Botany - Core ,Chemistry and Zoology - Complimentary

BSc Chemistry - Core, Physics Mathematics - Complimentary

BSc Mathematics - Core ,Physics,Statistics - Complimentary

B Com. Income tax law and Practice

PG. Courses
M.A. History

M.A. Economics

M.A  Hindi

M.A. Malayalam

M.Sc. Physics

M.Sc. Statistics

M.Com

M.A. English

M.A. Political Science

Research
Physics 

Hindi

History
Govt. Arts & Science College, the only Govt. College in Kozhikode City Corporation, was started in 1964. This institution is the result of the determined efforts of the people of Kozhikode, to have an institution for all sections of students, when there was an unprecedented rush for admission. It is the manifestation of the aspirations of the people of this area. The College was established as per Govt. Order No.309/Edn dated 29.07.1964. Regular work started on 10.08.1964. College was originally affiliated to Kerala University but subsequently brought under the newly formed University of Calicut in 1968. The College started functioning with just two halls and an office room as a temporary arrangement at the campus of Govt. Training College, Mananchira, Kozhikode. The first principal was Prof. Karimpuzha Ramakrishnan, an eminent professor as well as an efficient administrator. The College was shifted to the permanent building at Meenchanda in 1970. Today the College has a vast campus of 20.15 acres, which was once under the Zamorin’s the ruler of Kozhikode. The College has a harmonious natural setting with a rich diversity of plant life. When the College started functioning, there were only pre- degree courses. By Degree, th College has grown in size and shape. Today the College has 12 Degree Courses, 5 P G Courses and 1 Research Centre.

Notable alumni

 Kalpatta Narayanan, poet, novelist
 P. Vijayan, IPS, Inspector General of Police Kerala
 Girish Puthenchery, music director
 A. Sajeevan, Journalist
 K. M. Sachin Dev, Member of Kerala Legislative Assembly
 Joy Mathew, Malayalam film actor
 Santhosh Pandit, Malayalam film actor

References
 https://www.gasckkd.ac.in

Arts and Science colleges in Kerala
Universities and colleges in Kozhikode district
Colleges affiliated with the University of Calicut